Carbondale is an unincorporated community in Menominee County, in the U.S. state of Michigan.

History
A post office was established at Carbondale in 1881, and remained in operation until it was discontinued in 1904. The community was so named from the presence of a factory manufacturing charcoal, a carbon-based fuel.

References

Unincorporated communities in Menominee County, Michigan